Guido Wieland (1906–1993) was an Austrian stage, film and television actor.

Selected filmography
 1. April 2000 (1952)
 Adventure in Vienna (1952)
 The Doctor's Secret (1955)
 Scandal in Bad Ischl (1957)
 Eva (1958)
 The Street (1958)
 Girls for the Mambo-Bar (1959)
 The Good Soldier Schweik (1960)
 An Alibi for Death (1963)
 Come Fly with Me (1963)
 Help, My Bride Steals (1964)
 I Learned It from Father (1964)
 House of Pleasure (1969)
 Father Brown (1966–1968, TV series)
  (1970, TV miniseries)
 The Reverend Turns a Blind Eye (1971)
 Always Trouble with the Reverend (1971)
 The First Polka (1979)
  (1980, TV film)

References

Bibliography 
 Mitchell, Charles P. The Great Composers Portrayed on Film, 1913 through 2002. McFarland, 2004.

External links 
 

1906 births
1993 deaths
Austrian male television actors
Austrian male film actors
Austrian male stage actors
Male actors from Vienna